is a Japanese football player for Fujieda MYFC.

Career
After an initial stint with Cerezo Osaka, Uozato moved to Gainare Tottori with a full transfer in August 2018.

Club statistics
Updated to 22 August 2018.

References

External links

Profile at J. League
Profile at Cerezo Osaka

1995 births
Living people
Association football people from Hyōgo Prefecture
Japanese footballers
J1 League players
J3 League players
Cerezo Osaka players
Cerezo Osaka U-23 players
Gainare Tottori players
Association football midfielders